Babol Kenar may refer to:
 Babol Kenar District
 Babol Kenar Rural District